Gonista is a genus of grasshoppers in the family Acrididae, subfamily Gomphocerinae, and tribe Ochrilidiini; species are distributed in China and SE Asia.

Species
The Orthoptera Secies File lists:
Gonista bicolor (Haan, 1842) - type species (locality: Siboga, Sumatra)
Gonista chayuensis Yin, 1984
Gonista chinensis Willemse, 1932
Gonista chloroticus Bolívar, 1914
Gonista damingshanus Li, Lu, Jiang & Meng, 1991
Gonista longicercata Bouvy, 1982
Gonista meridionalis Johnsen, 1983
Gonista occidentalis Descamps, 1965
Gonista rotundata Uvarov, 1933
Gonista sagitta (Uvarov, 1912)
Gonista wenquanensis Zheng & Yao, 2006
Gonista yunnana Zheng, 1980

References

External links

Photo of G. bicolor on Flickr

Gomphocerinae
Acrididae genera
Orthoptera of Asia